European religion may refer to:

Religion in Europe
Religion in the European Union
Native ethnic religions of Europe
Ancient Greek religion
Religion in ancient Rome
Etruscan mythology
Celtic polytheism
Germanic paganism
Slavic mythology
Finnic mythologies

See also
Proto-Indo-European religion